Scooby-Doo! and the Reluctant Werewolf is a 1988 animated made-for-television film produced by Hanna-Barbera for syndication as part of the Hanna-Barbera Superstars 10 series. It marked Scrappy-Doo's last appearance as a protagonist in the Scooby-Doo franchise to date; he would not appear in a Scooby-Doo production again until the live-action Scooby-Doo film in 2002. It is also the last appearance of Shaggy's outfit from The 13 Ghosts of Scooby-Doo until Scooby-Doo and the Cyber Chase.

Plot

Every year, all of the classic Hollywood monsters (consisting of Frankenstein's monster, his wife Repulsa, a Mummy, the Witch Sisters, Bone Jangles the Skeleton, Dr. Jackyll/Mr. Snyde, Swamp Thing, and Dragonfly) gather at Count Dracula's castle in Transylvania for the "Monster Road Rally", a road race similar to Wacky Races, awarding the winner with the "Monster of the Year" award as well as many other macabre prizes as announced by Dracula's wife and co-host, Vanna Pira. However, this year, Dracula receives a postcard from the Wolfman stating that he has retired to Florida and thus will not be participating in any more races.

Dracula fears they will have to cancel the race due to this sudden absence, until his lion-like butler Wolfgong notifies him of a way to create a new werewolf. After searching an old book for information, it is revealed that the full moon comes into the perfect position to transform a human into a werewolf every five centuries, on three nights in a row that begin the following night. The one next in line to become the next werewolf is revealed to be none other than Shaggy Rogers, who recently demonstrated his skills on a racetrack by winning a car race with the help of his pit crew, Scooby-Doo, and his young nephew Scrappy-Doo.

Dracula sends his hunchbacked henchmen, "The Hunch Bunch" (consisting of the well-civilized Brunch and the gibberish-speaking Crunch), to America on a mission to turn Shaggy into a werewolf and bring him back to his castle for the race. The first two nights, the duo is unsuccessful, but on the final night, while Shaggy is at a drive-in movie, along with his girlfriend Googie, the Hunch Bunch manages to expose Shaggy to moonlight by dropping the sunroof of his customized race car with a push of its button, causing Shaggy to be transformed into a werewolf.

However, an unexpected anomaly cuts the Hunch Bunch's celebration short when they learn that Shaggy’s hiccups force him to alternate between human and werewolf. Not noticing Shaggy's transformations into a werewolf, Googie sends Shaggy to a nearby snack bar for something to cure his hiccups, and he attracts horror from the other movie watchers along the way. Hearing them speaking of a werewolf loose in the theater, Scooby hides in a nearby car. The Hunch Bunch attempts to abduct Shaggy, who flees from them and is then chased by the crowd when they see him as a werewolf. Upon meeting Scooby and seeing his reflection, Shaggy flees the drive-in with his car, Scooby, Scrappy, and Googie in tow, escaping his pursuers with the car's customized features, but loses his hiccups in the pursuit and thus remains trapped in werewolf form. The Hunch Bunch then knocks the group out with moon dust from their vehicle, the "Bat-Copter", and fly back to Transylvania, towing the car.

Revealing himself, Dracula explains to Shaggy why he was transformed, but Shaggy, having no desire to be a werewolf, is displeased and refuses to participate in Dracula's plans. After several failed attempts to bribe, blackmail, and coerce Shaggy, Dracula finally offers him a bargain: if Shaggy agrees to drive in the race and wins, Dracula will change him back to a human and allow him and his friends to leave. The deal is made, but Dracula still has no intent on keeping his promise.

The gang is then given good lodgings, treated as guests in the castle, and allowed all the food they wish for breakfast. Dracula then shows them the trail that Shaggy will have to follow for the race and consents to let them navigate the track in their own racecar, with the "Werewolf Wagon" currently undergoing maintenance for Shaggy. Dracula attempts to rig the track by sending the Hunch Bunch to implement traps, but despite their efforts, Shaggy completes the course expertly, making the Count worry that he may lose his werewolf. He subsequently changes the racecourse, sabotages the Werewolf Wagon, and has the Hunch Bunch deprive Shaggy of sleep.

The next morning, Googie energizes Shaggy with a kiss, and he repairs the Werewolf Wagon shortly after the race begins. Everyone conspires against Shaggy and Scooby throughout the race, from the Hunch Bunch's booby traps to some of the monstrous racers shrinking them or shooting lightning at them to Dracula himself putting up false detour signs and stealing their engine. But thanks to Googie and Scrappy, who follow along in their own car as their pit crew, as well as the incompetence of Dracula, the Hunch Bunch, and the racing monsters, they often end up doing more harm to themselves than him. After numerous failed attempts, Dracula loses his patience and unleashes his secret weapon, Genghis Kong, a towering ape-like beast, to stop Shaggy. As the other racers near the finish line, Googie and Scrappy return and rescue Shaggy and Scooby, then both pairs work together to make the monster fall onto the other cars, leaving an easy path to victory for Shaggy.

Furious to see all of his schemes have failed, Dracula reneges the deal, stating that there is no way to turn Shaggy back. However, after Vanna Pira reveals that the solution is in Dracula's spellbook, the gang steals the book and make an escape. Dracula chases after them in his weaponized car and then his own plane after the car is destroyed in the chase. The four barely manage to dodge Dracula's powerful gadgets, and seconds before Dracula gets the best of them, a thunderstorm ensues. Dracula's plane is struck by lightning, sending him plummeting into the ocean below, where a shark chases him off.

In the end, back home, Googie uses the book to change Shaggy back to human. That night, the gang all sit down to watch another horror movie and eat pizza. In the final scene, Dracula and the Hunch Bunch sneak up to their window swearing revenge, thus ending the film on a cliffhanger.

Voice cast
 Don Messick as Scooby-Doo and Scrappy-Doo
 Casey Kasem as Shaggy
 B.J. Ward as Googie and Repulsa
 Hamilton Camp as Count Dracula
 Jim Cummings as Frankenstein, Skull Head, Snack Bar Manager and Genghis Kong
 Joan Gerber as Witches and a Woman at Store
 Ed Gilbert as Dr. Jackyll, Mr. Snyde and the Narrator
 Brian Mitchell as Bonejangles
 Pat Musick as Vanna Pira
 Alan Oppenheimer as Mummy and Swamp Thing
 Rob Paulsen as Brunch
 Frank Welker as Crunch, the Spider Monster, Plant Monster and Tyler Country Racer #1

Home media
Warner Home Video released the film on VHS and DVD in Region 1 on March 5, 2002.

References

External links

 

1988 television films
1988 animated films
1988 films
1980s American animated films
1980s children's animated films
1980s monster movies
Hanna-Barbera animated films
Scooby-Doo animated films
Hanna–Barbera Superstars 10
Films based on television series
Animated films based on animated series
American children's animated fantasy films
Television films based on television series
American children's animated comedy films
American animated television films
Films directed by Ray Patterson (animator)
American comedy horror films
American monster movies
American vampire films
Films about witchcraft
American auto racing films
Animated films about auto racing
Dracula films
Mummy films
Frankenstein films
Motorsports in fiction
Werewolves in animated film
Vampires in animated film
Vampires in animated television
Dr. Jekyll and Mr. Hyde films
Films set in castles
Films set in Transylvania
Films with screenplays by Jim Ryan (writer)
American comedy television films
1980s English-language films